The 12th Illinois Cavalry Regiment was a volunteer cavalry regiment which served in the Union Army during the American Civil War.

History 
The 12th Cavalry was organized at Camp Butler in February 1862. It was part of the Army of the Potomac from September 1862 to November 1863; the Department of the Gulf from March 1864 to February 1865; and the Department of Texas from July 1865 to May 1866.

The 4th Illinois Cavalry was consolidated with the 12th Illinois Cavalry on June 14, 1865.

At the Gettysburg Battlefield, the monument to the unit is west of Gettysburg on Reynolds Avenue between the Railroad Cut and Chambersburg Road. It was dedicated in 1891 by the State of Illinois.

Total strength and casualties
The regiment suffered 38 enlisted men who were killed in action or who died of their wounds and 4 officers and 192 enlisted men who died of disease, for a total of 234 fatalities.

Commanders
Colonel Arno Voss (1861–1864)
Colonel Hasbrouck Davis (1865)

See also
List of Illinois Civil War Units
Illinois in the American Civil War

References

External links

Units and formations of the Union Army from Illinois
1862 establishments in Illinois
Military units and formations established in 1862
Military units and formations disestablished in 1866
1866 disestablishments in Illinois